The 1930 Beacom College football team represented Beacom College (now known as Goldey–Beacom College) in the 1930 college football season as an independent. Led by second-year head coach John D. Naylor, Beacom compiled a 1–5–1 record.

Schedule

References

Beacom College
Beacom College football seasons
Beacom College football